Milton Hernán Treppo (born 13 May 1996) is an Argentine professional footballer who plays as a centre-forward for Central Córdoba.

Career
Treppo started his career with Newell's Old Boys in 2010, with the forward appearing in their first-team squad during the 2017–18 Argentine Primera División season. He was an unused substitute in games against Olimpo and Lanús in September 2017, which preceded his professional debut arriving on 8 April 2018 during a home draw with Atlético Tucumán. Two further appearances followed in April, notably including his first appearance in the Copa Sudamericana against Atlético Paranaense on 12 April. Torneo Federal A side Racing de Córdoba completed the loan signing of Treppo in September.

In 2019, Treppo had a spell with 9 de Julio de Santa Fe. In 2020, Treppo headed to Primera C Metropolitana with Central Córdoba.

Career statistics
.

References

External links

1996 births
Living people
People from Rosario Department
Argentine footballers
Association football forwards
Argentine Primera División players
Torneo Federal A players
Primera C Metropolitana players
Newell's Old Boys footballers
Racing de Córdoba footballers
Central Córdoba de Rosario footballers
Sportspeople from Santa Fe Province